Shanghai Construction (Group) Corporation (SCG) is a Chinese construction and engineering company, ranked as the 16th largest construction company in the world based on 2011 revenues.

The group's listed arm Shanghai Construction Group Co., Ltd., was ranked at 1,096th on Forbes Global 2000 List, with a market cap of US$5.5 billion (as of May 2017).

The listed company was a constituent of SSE 180 Index and its sub-index SSE MidCap Index.สิริ

History
In the 1990s the company underwent fast-paced growth as the home city of Shanghai was finally allowed to join in the reform and growth sweeping China.  The city became a "builder's dream" and SCG benefited from the pent up zeal for projects with revenue climbing up 30% annually.  As the hometown builder, SCG is responsible for many of the landmarks of Shanghai including  Shanghai Tower.

International projects
SCG undertakes overseas construction projects and mining in Eritrea. It has an international focused subsidiary, the Shanghai (Group) Corporation for Foreign Economic & Technological Cooperation (SEFCO Group).

The company's construction of a five star hotel in Cairo despite local political instability was cited by the New York Times in 2012 as an example of the endurance Chinese companies had in their bid to establish operations in Egypt.

The SEFCO Group, a subsidiary of the company, acquired a 60% share in an Eritrean gold mine for $80 million at the end of 2011.

In February 2014, Shanghai Construction Group was awarded a contract for a sewage tunnelling project in Edmonton, Canada. The $11-million bid marked the first time that a Chinese firm had done tunnelling work in North America.

In 2014, the company was also contracted by the Tanzanian Ministry of Defence and National Service to construct 12,000 housing units for the Tanzanian Peoples’ Defence Force (TPDF) in a project financed by a $550m loan from the Exim Bank of China.

Through an American subsidiary, the Group bought the Hyatt Regency Orange County hotel for $137 million in 2015, following a trend in which Chinese state owned construction firms are increasingly investing in overseas real estate.

Footnotes

References

See also
 Shanghai Municipal Investment Group
 Shanghai Jiushi Group

Companies owned by the provincial government of China
Construction and civil engineering companies of China
Metal companies of China
Gold mining companies of China
Chinese companies established in 1994
Construction and civil engineering companies established in 1994
1994 establishments in China